Caney Creek is a stream in Scott County in southeast Missouri. The stream flows east then turns to the northwest passing under U.S. Route 61 twice north of Benton.

Caney Creek was so named on account of canebrake near its course.

See also
List of rivers of Missouri

References

Rivers of Scott County, Missouri
Rivers of Missouri